Generally speaking, a housing crisis may occur anywhere affordable housing becomes extremely scarce. Sometimes the term "housing crisis" refers to the opposite problem of a housing bubble, wherein house prices fall drastically and demand is low.

Housing crisis may more specifically refer to:

United States
 Housing insecurity in the United States
 Homelessness in the United States
 Homelessness in California
 Homelessness in the San Francisco Bay Area
 Homelessness in Colorado
 Homelessness in Florida
 California housing shortage
 San Francisco housing shortage
 Affordable housing in Silicon Valley
 New York City housing shortage

Other countries
 Canadian housing crisis
 Affordability of housing in the United Kingdom
 Welsh housing crisis, see Housing and construction in Wales
 Housing crisis in Brazil

Historic 
 Amsterdam coronation riots, height of the 1980s Dutch housing crisis
 1990s Albanian housing crisis
 2010s Pakistani housing shortage

See also 
 Housing inequality
 Housing bubble
 2000s United States housing bubble
 Subprime mortgage crisis 2007–2010
 2008–2012 Israeli housing bubble
 Housing gap
 Single-family zoning
 Missing middle housing